Mahsa or Mahsā is a feminine given name of Persian origin. The name has the meaning "like the moon". Mah is the Old Persian word for "moon", and -sā, as a suffix, means "representing, alike, as". Notable people with the name include:
 Mahsa Abdolzadeh (born 1985), Austrian politician, political scientist and women's rights and LGBT activist
 Mahsa Amini (1999–2022), Iranian-Kurdish woman whose death in the Islamic Republic of Iran's police custody sparked protests in Iran and in the world
 Mahsa Amrabadi (born 1984), Iranian journalist
 Mahsa Javar (born 1994), Iranian rower
 Mahsa Kadkhoda (born 1993), Iranian volleyball player
 Mahsa Mohaghegh, Iranian-born New Zealand computer engineer
 Mahsa Saberi (born 1993), Iranian volleyball player
 Mahsa Shahbazian (born 1984), Iranian musician, composer and Qanun player
 Mahsa Vahdat (born 1973), Persian classical and world music vocalist

See also 
 Mahsa (disambiguation)

References

Feminine given names
Iranian feminine given names
Persian feminine given names